KDPH-LD (channel 48) is a low-power religious television station in Phoenix, Arizona, United States, owned and operated by the Daystar Television Network. The station's transmitter is located atop South Mountain on the city's south side.

Daystar's presence in Phoenix dates to 2000, but the low-power license began in 1989 as the first Telemundo affiliate for Phoenix, originally on channel 64. Despite being a low-power station, the station, later known as KDRX-LP and KDRX-CA, produced local news programming. In 2002, Telemundo itself acquired KDRX and the co-owned Telemundo station in Tucson, KHRR. Telemundo and Daystar agreed in 2005 to an unusual license and facility swap; Telemundo traded a full-power station in Holbrook, Arizona, KPHZ, and the low-power channel 48 for its full-power KDTP (channel 39), which was accompanied by the redesignation of channel 39 for commercial use. This allowed Telemundo to compete more effectively with Univision in Phoenix.

History
An original construction permit for low-power television station K64DR, channel 64, was granted to Broadcasting Systems, Inc. on August 23, 1989. It was the second channel 64 construction permit in Phoenix; the first was owned by KNIX-FM 102.5 and dropped when the FCC decided to add a full-power channel 61 allocation to Phoenix, posing potential interference problems were it and channel 64 to both be built. The station was quickly built and was licensed on October 31, just two months later. It was affiliated with Telemundo and aired very little local programming. In December 1990, the station was sold to Hispanic Broadcasters of Arizona, Inc., which owned Tucson Telemundo affiliate "KHR" (later KHRR). Channel 64 grew quickly: it had 19 local staff by 1995, even though Cox Communications cable carried the national feed instead. In 1996, after LPTV stations were allowed to adopt four-letter call signs, K64DR (frequently known as "KDR") became KDRX-LP.

In October 1997, KDRX-LP added a Spanish-language newscast produced locally by ABC affiliate KNXV-TV (channel 15). The station would begin producing its own newscast a few years later after moving into KNXV's former Phoenix studio facility.

The station was sold to Apogeo Television Phoenix LLC in 1999 and moved to channel 48 in 2000, improving over-the-air reception. They became a Class A television station a year later when that class of station was approved by the FCC. The locally produced newscast and the move to in-core channel 48 helped them to qualify for the new status, giving them primary station protection during the digital television conversion of full-service stations, and guaranteeing them an opportunity to upgrade to digital TV. In December 2002, Telemundo acquired KDRX-LP and KHRR for $19 million apiece.

However, Telemundo in Phoenix was up against one of the country's most dominant Univision outlets, full-powered KTVW. In 2005, Univision cornered 89% of the Spanish-language ratings in Phoenix, which was the last major market where it enjoyed such an advantage. In order to compete, Telemundo owner NBC reasoned, the station needed to upgrade to a full-powered signal. Thus, NBC filed an application with the FCC to move the license of full-power NBC Telemundo-owned KPHZ (now KTAZ) from Holbrook channel 11 to Phoenix channel 39. In exchange, Daystar-owned station KDTP would move from Phoenix channel 39 to Holbrook channel 11, and KDRX-CA would be transferred to Daystar in order to keep a Daystar Television Network outlet in Phoenix. It was an unusual request and complicated, involving not only a swap of licenses but also non-commercial reservations in Phoenix and Holbrook, plus the two low-powered stations (KPHZ-LP—later KDTP-LP—would be added to the deal later), but in October 2005, the FCC agreed to the proposal, over the objection of Univision.

In June 2006, the station's license was transferred to Community Television Educators, Inc., while the intellectual unit moved to KTAZ. Later that month, KDRX-CA's call letters changed to KDTP-CA, reflecting the station's new owner, Daystar. The station continued to air Telemundo programming pending completion of new facilities for KTAZ but changed its programming to the Daystar Television Network in July 2006 when the construction was complete.

On February 4, 2008, KDTP-CA converted its Class A license back to a standard low-power license, likely because a Class A license requires local programs and the schedule for channel 48 was entirely the national Daystar schedule. No longer able to use the "-CA" suffix, and with "KDTP-LP" already belonging to its sister station on channel 58, the station changed its call sign to K48LK and then to KDPH-LP on March 1.

Subchannels
The station's digital signal is multiplexed:

References

External links
 Daystar Television Network

Religious television stations in the United States
DPH-LP
Daystar (TV network) affiliates
Television channels and stations established in 1989
1989 establishments in Arizona
Low-power television stations in the United States